Amaras is a village de jure in the Khojavend District of Azerbaijan, de facto in the Martuni Province of the self-proclaimed Republic of Artsakh. It was a prominent religious and educational center in the Artsakh province of the Kingdom of Armenia. Amaras is the site of the Amaras Monastery, one of the oldest in Nagorno Karabakh.

References 
 

Populated places in Khojavend District